Nazir Mustafa Karamagi (born December 13, 1953) is a Tanzanian politician and a Member of Parliament in the National Assembly of Tanzania, representing Bukoba Vijijini constituency.

Karamagi has been a member of the National Executive Council of the Chama Cha Mapinduzi (CCM) since 2002. He was appointed Minister of Industry, Trade and Marketing in the Cabinet named on January 4, 2006. He was then moved to the position of Minister of Energy and Minerals on October 15, 2006, remaining in the latter post until he resigned on February 7, 2008, after being implicated in a scandal regarding a government contract to supply emergency power. His resignation came shortly after Prime Minister Edward Lowassa resigned for the same reason.

According to Karamagi, he took over the Ministry of Energy and Minerals six months after the government had signed the aforementioned contract, which Karamagi said was a deal made in good faith and intended to provide more energy for the country.

References

1953 births
Living people
Chama Cha Mapinduzi politicians
Energy in Tanzania
Alumni of the University of Edinburgh
Alumni of the University of Strathclyde